Susannah Jane Rankin  (26 November 1897 – 24 July 1989, née Ellis) was a Welsh Congregational minister, religious educator, linguist and translator. She spent time as a missionary in Papua New Guinea. She translated works from Welsh and English to the Motu language.

Early life and education 
Susannah Jane Ellis was born at Pengorffwysfa farm, near Llanfyllin, Montgomeryshire, the daughter of Frank Ellis and Jane Ellis. In 1922, she was the first woman at the University of Wales to earn a Bachelor of Divinity, having studied at Bala-Bangor Theological Seminary. She was ordained in 1925 at Pendref, Llanfyllin.

Career 
After serving as a lecturer at Lawes Theological College in Fife Bay. In 1927, Rankin became an evangelist, posted to Port Moresby, Papua New Guinea. In 1928, she went to Kalaigoro to improve the mission work there. In 1930, she moved to Saroa to unite the coastal and inland missions. She taught English and studied the Motu language, and other local languages. She married her husband Robert Rankin, a fellow missionary, in Moru in 1932. They both returned to the mission station she had established at Saroa and where she would be involved in setting up primary schools. They would leave Saro and PNG in 1956 for a year's leave before returning to Veiru.

She and her husband, were appointed Professor and Principal at Chalmers Memorial Theological College after its establishment in 1957. Her husband died three years later, and she took over the role of Principal until 1964. After retiring in 1965, she returned to Moru and mission work. For her translation work from Welsh and English to the Motu language, Rankin received an Honorary M.A. degree from the University of Wales.

Personal life 
Susannah Ellis married Robert Rankin in 1932. Robert Rankin died in 1960, during a leave in Australia. Rankin died in Australia in 1989, aged 91 years.

References

1897 births
1989 deaths
19th-century Welsh people
19th-century Welsh women
20th-century British translators
20th-century linguists
20th-century Welsh clergy
20th-century Welsh educators
20th-century Welsh women writers
20th-century Welsh writers
20th-century women educators
People from Montgomeryshire
Congregationalist missionaries in Papua New Guinea
Women Christian clergy
Welsh Congregationalist ministers
Female Christian missionaries
Linguists from the United Kingdom
Women linguists
Members of the Order of the British Empire
Welsh translators
Welsh evangelists
Women evangelists
Alumni of the University of Wales
Missionary educators
Welsh Congregationalist missionaries
Translators from English
Translators from Welsh
Missionary linguists
20th-century Congregationalist ministers